The Aras Dam is an embankment dam on the Aras River along the border of Iran and Azerbaijan. It is located downstream of Poldasht in West Azerbaijan Province, Iran and Nakhchivan City in Nakhchivan Autonomous Republic, Azerbaijan. The primary purpose of the dam is hydroelectric power production and water supply.

History
On 11 August 1957, a protocol was signed between the Soviet Union and Iran in Tehran to construct the Aras Dam on the Aras River.  This was done at a time when Azerbaijan was under Soviet control. Construction on the dam began in 1963 and it was completed in 1970.  The dam was officially inaugurated on 28 June 1971 by Iranian deputy prime minister Safi Asfia and the Deputy Chairman of the Soviet Council of Ministers Mikhail Yefremov.

A supplementary protocol to the border agreement of 1954 between Iran and the Soviet Union was signed on 7 May 1970 in Moscow to redelimit the border along the Aras reservoir.

Specifications

Dam
It is an embankment type with sand fill and a clay core.

Reservoir
The Araz reservoir, also known as Araz Water Junction is a large reservoir created by the Aras Dam and shared by Nakhchivan exclave of Azerbaijan Republic and Iran.

Of the reservoir's normal capacity,  of it is active or "useful" while  is inactive or dead storage.

There are a total of four hydro-electric stations in Azerbaijan and Iran (two on each side) with four turbines.

Power station
The dam's power station contains four turbine-generators for a capacity of  each. Two of the generators are on the Iranian side and the other two on the Azerbaijani side along with the dam's spillway. The total installed capacity is 44 MW.

See also
 List of power stations in Azerbaijan

References

External links

Dams completed in 1970
Dams in Azerbaijan
Dams in West Azerbaijan Province
Nakhchivan Autonomous Republic
Iran–Soviet Union relations
Earth-filled dams
Hydroelectric power stations in Iran
Hydroelectric power stations in Azerbaijan
Hydroelectric power stations built in the Soviet Union